= Architecture of Israel (magazine) =

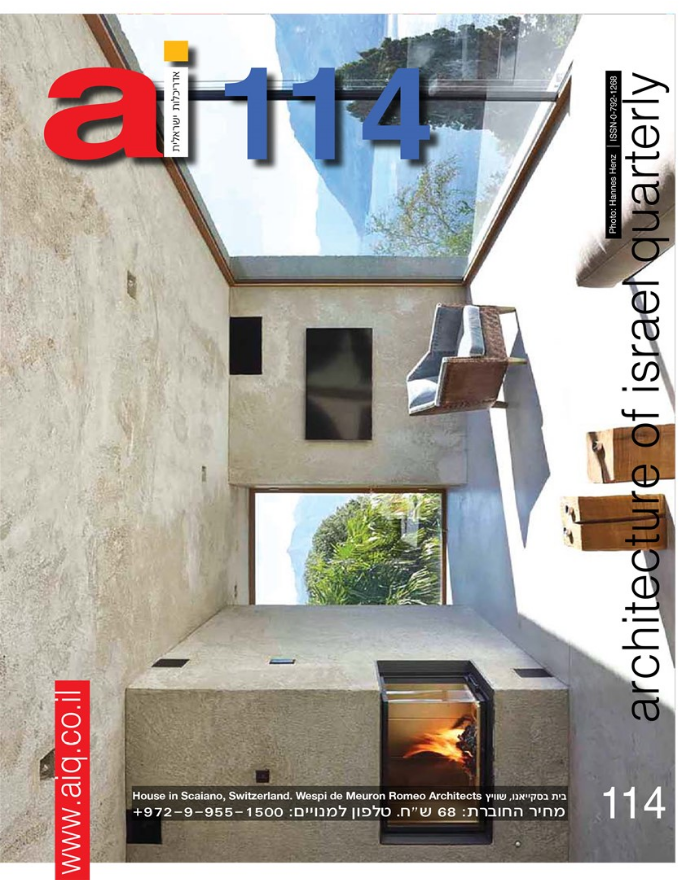
A cover of the 114th issue of Architecture of Israel

Architecture of Israel (AI) is a Hebrew & English bilingual quarterly magazine dealing with architecture, interior design and the environment.

Published since January 1988, the aims of the magazine, as stated on its website www.aiq.co.il, are to "promote climate and environmental awareness, creative and feasible architecture". AI provides a stage for Israeli architecture in an international context and conducts each year an international competition together with the European Union, titled "Project of the Year". The judges are worldwide known academics and architects.

Permanent sections:

- "Food for Thought", deals with how other fields of life impact architecture
- "Curiosity", covering events, competitions and exhibitions
- Interviews with Israeli and international architects
- "House of the Season", presents a different perspective on the residential issue
- "Guest of the Season", the professional profile of a selected architect
- "Architects Telling", behind-the-scenes stories about well-known buildings
